The Joseph Smith Birthplace Memorial is a granite obelisk on a hill in the White River Valley near Sharon and South Royalton in the U.S. state of Vermont. It marks the spot where Joseph Smith was born on December 23, 1805. The monument was erected by the Church of Jesus Christ of Latter-day Saints (LDS Church), which recognizes Smith as its first president and founding prophet. The LDS Church continues to own and operate the site as a tourist attraction.

History

In 1884, LDS Church leader Junius F. Wells visited Smith's birthplace and conceived a plan to build a monument to the Mormon prophet. Under the direction of church president Joseph F. Smith, Wells oversaw the construction of the monument and cottage house in 1905. The Joseph Smith Birthplace Memorial was dedicated by Joseph F. Smith on the 100th anniversary of Joseph Smith's birth, on December 23, 1905.

By 1907, Wells reported that there had been between seven and eight thousand visitors.

Description
The obelisk was quarried in Barre, Vermont, and it has been cited as a "remarkable engineering feat" and "one of the largest polished shafts in the world".

A visitors' center and an LDS Church meetinghouse sit on the same property as the memorial. Admission to the visitors' center and tours of the memorial site are free.

Notes

References
Gerry Avant, "Memorializing Prophet who was born here", Deseret Morning News, 2005-12-31, p. Z08.
Keith A. Erekson, "The Joseph Smith Memorial Monument and Royalton’s 'Mormon Affair': Religion, Community, Memory, and Politics in Progressive Vermont", Vermont History 73:117–151 (2005).
Susa Young Gates, "Memorial Monument Dedication", Improvement Era, Feb. 1906.
 George Albert Smith, "The duty of sustaining home industries, and home institutions—Incidents of the journey to Vermont and return—Remarkable interest and kindness manifest to President Smith and party—Providential help in overcoming obstacles in erection of monument—The finished structure a credit to the Church, and to Junius F. Wells" Conference Report, April 1906.

Further reading

External links

Joseph Smith Birthplace Memorial: official website

1905 sculptures
Buildings and structures completed in 1905
History of the Church of Jesus Christ of Latter-day Saints
Birthplace memorial
Monuments and memorials in Vermont
Obelisks in the United States
Properties of the Church of Jesus Christ of Latter-day Saints
Buildings and structures in Royalton, Vermont
Buildings and structures in Sharon, Vermont
Stone sculptures in Vermont
Tourist attractions in Windsor County, Vermont
1905 establishments in Vermont
Smith, Joseph